Timothy D. Barrett is an American papermaker, and director of the Center for the Book, at the University of Iowa, from 1996 to 2002. He remains on the staff of the Center for the Book, and in 2009 received a MacArthur Foundation grant.

He graduated from Antioch College with a BA degree in Art Communications in 1973.

Awards
 2009 MacArthur Fellows Program

Works
Early European papers/contemporary conservation papers: a report on research undertaken from fall 1984 through fall 1987, Institute of Paper Conservation, 1989
Japanese Papermaking: Traditions, Tools and Techniques, Weatherhill, 1983, 
Nagashizuki: the Japanese craft of hand papermaking, North Hills, Pa.: Bird & Bull Press, 1979 
Paper through Time: Nondestructive Analysis of 14th- through 19th-Century Papers, The University of Iowa, 2012.

References

External links

Living people
Antioch College alumni
University of Iowa faculty
MacArthur Fellows
American book publishers (people)
Papermaking in the United States
Papermakers
Year of birth missing (living people)